Tenellia adspersa, common name the miniature aeolis, is a species of very small sea slug, an aeolid nudibranch, a marine gastropod mollusk in the family Fionidae. It is the type species of the genus Tenellia.

In Britain this solitary species is referred to as the lagoon sea slug.

Description 
The color of this nudibranch is generally pale yellow to light brown, with black speckles. The length is up to 8 mm.

Distribution 
The indigenous distribution of Tenellia adspersa is the Northeastern Atlantic Ocean, Baltic Sea, the Mediterranean Sea, Black Sea and Caspian Sea.

This species is fully protected in the United Kingdom under the Wildlife and Countryside Act 1981 since 1992.

The species is thought to be introduced in:
 Chesapeake Bay, Virginia;
 Massachusetts
 San Francisco Bay, Elkhorn Slough, and Long Beach, California;
 Coos Bay, Oregon.

Ecology

Habitat 
This small sea slug is found amongst hydroids and sometimes crawling along the substrate in coastal intertidal and shallow sublittoral zones, and is also found in estuaries. It prefers small rocks to sea grass bottoms, and occurs on man-made substrates as well. It prefers sheltered, low wave action waters.

Life cycle 
Adults produce up to 100 eggs. Larvae are pelagic. They are sexually mature at 20 days old. Life span is less than one year usually.

Feeding habits 
This sea slug is known to rapidly devour hydroid colonies. Tenellia adspersa is a carnivore feeding primarily on hydroids such as Cordylophora caspia.

References 
This article incorporates public domain text (a public domain work of the United States Government) from the reference.

Fionidae
Gastropods described in 1845
Taxa named by Alexander von Nordmann